Chaetodon trichrous (Tahiti butterflyfish) is a species of fish in the family Chaetodontidae.

Taxonomy
This species is included in the subgenus Lepidochaetodon. In 1984, André and Roland Bauchot Maugé proposed to include this species in a new genus Mesochaetodon.

Description
The back half of the body is dark brown to black, while the front part is grayish, with a small vertical black stripe through the eye. The tail is yellow.

Biology
These fishes feed over hard substrate and on plankton. They usually live singly, in pairs or in small groups.

Distribution
This species is endemic to French Polynesia (Marquesas Islands, Society Islands, Tahiti, Tuamotu Archipelago) in the central-south Pacific Ocean.

Habitat
Chaetodon trichrous prefers shallow coastal habitats, lagoon reefs and rocky reefs, at depths between 3 and 25 meters.

References

External links
 ITIS
 Animal Diversity Web
 Catalogue of life
 NCBI
 

trichrous
Fish of Oceania
Endemic fauna of French Polynesia
Least concern biota of Oceania
Fish described in 1874
Taxa named by Albert Günther